Lunag Ri is a mountain in the Rolwaling Himal mountain range of the Himalayas.

The Jobo Rinjang forms a southeastern secondary summit of Lunag Ri. On the southern flank of the Lunag Ri runs the Lunag glacier. In the east flows the Nangpa glacier. On the northern slope lies the feeding area of the Shalong glacier.

History
Lunag Ri was first climbed on October 25, 2018, by the Austrian climber David Lama, for which he won a 2019 Piolet d'Or. Lama ascended the mountain solo. Lama and the American climber Conrad Anker had failed to make the summit at two previous attempts in November 2015 and fall 2016. During the second attempt, Anker suffered a heart attack.

References

External links

 Picture on summitpost.org
 explorersweb.com: Chad Kellogg and David Gottlieb return to Lunag Ri (6895m)
 Picture of the Lunag Ri massif at summitpost.org

Six-thousanders of the Himalayas
Mountains of Koshi Province
Mountains of Tibet
China–Nepal border